Lake Saadjärv is a lake in middle-east Estonia with an area of 7.08 km2(1,750 acres). The lake is 53.4 m (175 ft) above sea-level.

This lake is referenced in Canto VIII of the epic "The Hero of Estonia" by William Forsell Kirby.

See also

List of lakes in Estonia

References 

Lakes of Estonia
Tartu Parish
Lakes of Tartu County